Paid in Full is a 1950 American drama film directed by William Dieterle and written by Robert Blees and Charles Schnee. The film stars Robert Cummings, Lizabeth Scott, Diana Lynn, Eve Arden, Ray Collins and Frank McHugh. The film was released on February 15, 1950 by Paramount Pictures.

Plot
The movie opens with Jane Langley giving birth while gravely ill. She has given a fake name to the doctor, who tells her that she has the choice of giving up the baby or sacrificing her own life. She says that the child must live.

A flashback shows how things came to this pass. Jane's mother died in childbirth; she raised her younger sister, Nancy. Now both work with Bill Prentice, an advertising executive, Jane as a clothing designer and Nancy as a model. Jane is in love with Bill, but Bill prefers Nancy and marries her. Nancy, who is portrayed as selfish, quickly becomes bored by married life, preferring to spend time with old friends. But the idea of having a baby excites her, even though the family doctor, Fredericks, has cautioned that childhood will be risky for both sisters. When a daughter, Deborah, is born, Nancy is possessive of her and treats Bill coldly. She begins to contemplate divorce.

One night after Jane and Bill begin to realize they have feelings for one another, Nancy falsely assumes they have had an affair behind her back. After an angry scene, a distraught Jane drives off and accidentally kills Deborah. Nancy and Bill are divorced, but Nancy is traumatized by the death of her child and is undergoing therapy. The doctor tells Jane that it would help if Nancy could have an adopted child. Jane has the idea of conceiving a child with Bill and giving it to the couple. She approaches Bill and pushes for a quick marriage in Mexico. Once she is pregnant, she runs off to have the baby, knowing that she might die in the process. The doctor has contacted Nancy and Bill, who come to see Jane on her deathbed. Jane gives them the baby, hoping that they can start over as a couple. They name the baby Jane.

Cast
Robert Cummings as Bill Prentice
Lizabeth Scott as Jane Langley
Diana Lynn as Nancy Langley
Eve Arden as Tommy Thompson
Ray Collins as Dr. Fredericks
Frank McHugh as Ben
Stanley Ridges as Dr. P.J. 'Phil' Winston
Louis Jean Heydt as Dr. Carter
John Bromfield as Dr. Clark
Kristine Miller as Miss Williams
Kasey Rogers as Tina
Lora Lee Michel as Betsy

Production
It was based on a story by a doctor, Loomis, who said he wrote it when he couldn't sleep one night. Filming began October 1948 under the title Bitter Victory.

References

External links
 

1950 films
1950 drama films
American drama films
American black-and-white films
Films scored by Victor Young
Films directed by William Dieterle
Films produced by Hal B. Wallis
Paramount Pictures films
1950s English-language films
1950s American films